Talaq is a 1958 Indian Bollywood drama film starring Rajendra Kumar and produced by Anupam Chitra studios. Director Mahesh Kaul was nominated for a Filmfare Award for Best Director and the film was also nominated for a Filmfare Award for Best Movie. The music is by C. Ramchandra. Playback singers for the film include Asha Bhosle and Manna Dey with songs such as "Mere Jeevan Me" and "Zuk Gayi Dekho Garda" . Art direction for the film was conducted by Biren Nag and it was shot in Ranjit Studios in Bombay.

Plot
The film begins with school teacher Indu in her school. She lives with her eccentric check-suited unemployed father, Moolchand Chabbe. She falls in love with Ravi Shankar Chaube, a poet and an engineer, after hearing him singing patriotic songs during an Independence day celebration. He moves in to live in the room beneath their apartment. They marry, and Indu quits her job to raise a son named Ashoo. The marriage becomes difficult when Moolchand borrows money from Ravi and loses it gambling. Indu is forced to return to her old job and faces the prospect of a divorce.

Cast
Rajendra Kumar as Ravi Shankar Chaubey
Kamini Kadam as Indu Chaubey
Radhakrishan as Moolchand Chabbe
Malika as Child Artist
Laxmi Chhaya as Child Artist
Sajjan as Mangal
Kusum Thakur as Tara
Yashodra Katju as Kamini 
Daisy Irani as Ashu

Music
 "Bolo Tum Kaun Ho" - Asha Bhosle, Manna Dey
 "Sambhalke Rehna" - Manna Dey
 "Jhuk Gayi Dekho Gardan" - Asha Bhosle
 "Nayi Umar Ki Kaliyon" - Asha Bhosle
 "O Babushab" - Manna Dey, Asha Bhosle
 "Dukhiyon Pe Kuch Raham Karo" - Aarti Mukherjee, Asha Bhosle

References

External links
 
 Talaq (Post in The Hindu)

1958 films
1950s Hindi-language films
Films scored by C. Ramchandra